Alabama Indian Affairs Commission (AIAC) was created by a legislative act in 1984 and represents more than 38,000 American Indian families who are residents of the U.S. state of Alabama.

On the topic of why they exist, the AIAC said "Recognizing the unique cultural and sociological needs of Alabama's "invisible minority", the Legislature specifically charged AIAC to… "…deal fairly and effectively with Indian affairs; to bring local, state, federal resources into focus…for Indian citizens of the State of Alabama; to provide aid…assist Indian Communities…promote recognition of the right of Indians to pursue cultural and religious traditions…" Noting that charge for action, AIAC is placed in a liaison/advocacy role between the various departments of governments and the Indian people of our tribal communities. AIAC stands alone to represent the Indian people of Alabama who wish to stand together with their fellow citizens while maintaining their own cultural and ethnic heritage".

Tribes recognized 
The commission recognizes the Poarch Band of Creek Indians, the Echota Cherokee Tribe of Alabama, the Cherokee Tribe of Northeast Alabama, the Ma-Chis Lower Creek Indian Tribe of Alabama, the Star Clan of Muscogee Creeks, the Cher-O-Creek Intra Tribal Indians, the MOWA Band of Choctaw Indians, the Piqua Shawnee Tribe, and the United Cherokee Ani-Yun-Wiya Nation.

Programs and Scholarships
The AIAC provides many programs, such as Miss Indian Alabama, Native American Business Owner Profile, and the AIAC Scholarship.

Goal
The legislature specifically charged the AIAC to "deal fairly and effectively with Indian affairs; to bring local, state, federal resources into focus...for Indian citizens of the State of Alabama; to provide aid…assist Indian Communities...promote recognition of the right of Indians to pursue cultural and religious traditions..."

External links
 

1984 in law
1984 establishments in Alabama
Native American organizations